Rick B. Engles (born August 18, 1954 in Tulsa, Oklahoma) is a former professional American football player who played in three NFL seasons from 1976 to 1978 for the Seattle Seahawks, Pittsburgh Steelers and Philadelphia Eagles.

1954 births
American football punters
Living people
Sportspeople from Tulsa, Oklahoma
Philadelphia Eagles players
Pittsburgh Steelers players
Seattle Seahawks players
Tulsa Golden Hurricane football players
Players of American football from Oklahoma